Holy Trinity Church, Nottingham was a Church of England church in Nottingham from 1841 to 1958.

History

It was designed by the architect Henry Isaac Stevens.

It was built at a cost of £10,000. The living was in the gift of Trustees; and had a net income of £400.

It was built on land released under the 1839 enclosure of Burton Leys and out of the parish of St. Mary's Church, Nottingham.

In 1859, the parishioners built Trinity Free Church as a chapel of ease to Holy Trinity. This later became independent as St. Stephen's Church, Bunker's Hill.

The church was closed for a period in 1873 when a major restoration was undertaken. The restoration work was carried out under the supervision of architect William Arthur Heazell at a cost of £1,650.

The spire was the tallest in Nottingham. Unfortunately, the spire was declared unsafe after the heavy bombing raid in the Second World War, although there was some dispute as to whether the bombing had caused the damage, and it was removed by October 1942. Stones from the spire were used in the new drive at St John the Evangelist's Church, Carrington when the entrance from Mansfield Road was walled up and a new drive created from Church Drive, and other stones were incorporated into a wall on the Carrington Lido side of St John's Church.

In 1954, Canon R.J.R. Skipper of Holy Trinity Church, Lenton, died in the pulpit whilst preaching.

Incumbents

Thomas Francis Penrose Hart Davies 1841–1851
Thomas Mosse MacDonald 1851–1871
James Allan Smith 1871–1885
William Russell Blackett 1885–1892
Percy Holbrook 1892–1934
Albert Tom Cosford 1934–1936
Robert Henry Makepeace 1936–1942
Harry Holden 1942 – ????

Organ
The organ was built by J.W. Walker and installed in 1845. It was renovated in 1873 by Lloyd and Dudgeon of Nottingham when it moved from the west end gallery to the newly extended chancel. On closure of the church in 1958, the organ was moved to Holy Trinity Church, Clifton, but no longer exists there.

Organists

Mr. Wright ca. 1863
Mr. Atkin ca. 1870
W.Telford Cockrem 1871 – ???? (afterwards organist of St. Thomas' Church, Nottingham)
Charles Rogers ca. 1884
Mr. Hibbert ca. 1893
Jabez Hack ca. 1910
Vernon Sydney Read 1913 – 1920 (formerly organist of St Augustine's Church, New Basford, afterwards organist of Holy Trinity Church, Lenton)
H. F. Dunnicliff 1925 – 1928 (afterwards organist of Limpsfield Parish Church, Surrey)
H. Blyton Dobson 1928 – 1936
Cecil Thomas Payne 1936 – 1940
Stanley Bell Nolan ca. 1941
H. A. Gascoigne ???? – 1950 
Geoffrey Knight 1950 – ????

Closure and demolition

The church was demolished in 1958 and the Trinity Square site used for a multi-storey car park until 2006. This has now been redeveloped as the Trinity Square shopping centre.

The church name was preserved with the new Holy Trinity Church, opened in 1958 in the Nottingham suburb of Clifton.

References

External links
 Picture the Past: archive image of interior of Holy Trinity, Nottingham
 Picture the Past: archive drawing of Holy Trinity, Nottingham
 Picture the Past: archive photo of Holy Trinity, Nottingham
 Picture the Past: archive photo of Holy Trinity, Nottingham
 Picture the Past: archive drawing of Holy Trinity, Nottingham

Former Church of England church buildings
19th-century Church of England church buildings
Church of England church buildings in Nottinghamshire
Demolished buildings and structures in Nottingham
Churches in Nottingham
Buildings and structures demolished in 1958